Helen Cornelius (born Helen Lorene Johnson; December 6, 1941) is an American country singer-songwriter, best remembered for a series of hit duets with Jim Ed Brown, many of which reached the U.S. country singles top ten during the late 1970s and early 1980s.

Biography
Helen Cornelius was born in Monroe City, Missouri, and was raised on a farm nearby. Her older brothers played in country bands, and she formed a singing trio with sisters Judy and Sharon. Together they toured locally with the blessing of their father. Subsequently, Helen began touring on her own with a backup band called The Crossroads.

After completing high school, Cornelius wed and became employed as a secretary. She began touring again at the end of the 1960s and signed with Screen Gems Music as a songwriter in 1970. When the company went under, she sent a demo tape to Jerry Crutchfield, who offered her a contract with MCA Records; eventually she signed with Columbia Records, with whom she released two singles. In 1975, she signed with RCA Records; two further singles followed with little recognition.

In 1976, she recorded a duet, "I Don't Want to Have to Marry You" with Jim Ed Brown; it was a major success in America. Further solo singles failed to take off, but her next duet with Brown, "Saying Hello, Saying I Love You, Saying Goodbye", was another smash, and the pair began playing on the TV show, Nashville on the Road. She continued to record with Brown, releasing the hits "I'll Never Be Free", "If the World Ran Out of Love Tonight", "Don't Bother to Knock", "Lying in Love with You", and finally notching a solo hit with "Whatcha Doin' After Midnight Baby". In 1981, after topping the U.S. country charts one last time with Brown with "Morning Comes too Early", Cornelius separated with Brown, and enjoyed moderate success as a solo artist, touring with The Statler Brothers and performing in an Annie Get Your Gun road show. In 1988, she and Brown reunited for a nationwide tour.

Cornelius opened Nashville South in Gatlinburg, Tennessee, in the 1990s, where she performed with a house band nightly. Early in the 2000s, she took a regular gig at the Jim Stafford Theater in Branson, Missouri.  Most recently, Cornelius has been an active participant in the Country's Family Reunion series, which airs on RFD-TV.

Discography

Albums

Albums with Jim Ed Brown

Singles

Singles with Jim Ed Brown

Music videos

References

1941 births
American women country singers
American country singer-songwriters
Living people
Singer-songwriters from Missouri
Country musicians from Missouri
People from Monroe City, Missouri
21st-century American women